Hesdin-l'Abbé is a commune in the Pas-de-Calais department in the Hauts-de-France region of France.

Geography
The A16 autoroute forms part of the western border of the commune and the river Liane the southern.

Population

Places of interest
 The church of St.Leger, dating from the seventeenth century.
 The eighteenth-century chateau d'Hesdin-l'Abbé, nowadays the Hotel Cléry.
 A seventeenth-century manorhouse.

See also
Communes of the Pas-de-Calais department

References

Hesdinlabbe